Gmina Baranów is a rural gmina (administrative district) in Puławy County, Lublin Voivodeship, in eastern Poland.

Villages
Gmina Baranów contains the villages and settlements of Baranów, Czołna, Dębczyna, Gródek, Huta, Karczunek, Klin, Kozioł, Łukawica, Łukawka, Łysa Góra, Motoga, Niwa, Nowomichowska, Pogonów, Składów, Śniadówka, Wola Czołnowska, and Zagóźdź.

Neighbouring gminas
Gmina Baranów is bordered by the gminas of Abramów, Jeziorzany, Michów, Ułęż, and Żyrzyn.

References

External links
Polish official population figures 2006

External links
 The old website (archived)

Baranow
Puławy County